Ronald Winterton is a Republican member of the Utah Senate, representing the 20th District since 2023. Prior to redistricting he represented the 26th District starting in 2019.

Political career

Winterton served as a Duchesne County Commissioner from 2009 to 2019.

In 2018, Winterton ran for election to the Utah State Senate, representing the 26th district, which covers Daggett, Duchesne, Summit, Uintah, and Wasatch counties. He won a three-way Republican primary with 43.1% of the vote, and won the general election with 62.7% of the vote.

Winterton currently sits on the following Senate committees:
 Health and Human Services (Chair) 
 Transportation, Public Utilities, Energy, and Technology

Electoral record

References

External links
 Profile at Ballotpedia
 Profile at Vote Smart

Republican Party Utah state senators
Year of birth missing (living people)
Living people
21st-century American politicians